The Piedemonte is  a region of the Colombian Department of Meta.

References 

Meta Department